The eastern skink (Scincus mitranus), also commonly known as the Arabian sand skink and the eastern sand fish, is a species of lizard in the skink family (Scincidae).

Etymology
The specific name, mitranus, is in honour of Indian archeologist and anthropologist "Bábu Rájendralála Mitra" (1824–1891).

Description
On the side it has a line or spots in a light colour, and the back and legs have vague dark bands. The snout is shaped like a bill, and the legs and tail are short.

Behaviour
The eastern skink can run quickly, or slide over the sand and dig itself in quickly when it is in danger.

Diet
S. mitranus preys on several kinds of arthropods, especially centipedes and beetles.

Geographic range and habitat
S. mitranus is found in the Arabian Peninsula (Kuwait, Oman, Qatar, Saudi Arabia, and the United Arab Emirates), western Iran, and Pakistan. Its presence in Pakistan is disputed.

Habitat
S. mitranus is associated with loose sand dune (aeolian) habitats.

Reproduction
The eastern skink is viviparous, which gives it an advantage compared to other species in the area, as its eggs cannot desiccate.

References

Further reading
Anderson J (1871). "Description of a New Species of Scincus ". Proc. Asiatic Soc. Bengal 1871: 115–116. (Scincus mitranus, new species).
Boulenger GA (1887). Catalogue of the Lizards in the British Museum (Natural History). Second Edition. Volume III. ... Scincidæ ... London: Trustees of the British Museum (Natural History). (Taylor and Francis, printers). xii + 575 pp. + Plates I-XL. (Scincus mitranus, p. 393).

Scincus
Reptiles of Iran
Reptiles of Pakistan
Reptiles of the Arabian Peninsula
Eastern skink
Eastern skink